ᵷ or turned g is a letter of the Latin alphabet, formed by rotating g 180°. It is used to transliterate the Georgian letter ჹ. ჹ itself is the Georgian letter გ "g" rotated.

In 1900, turned g was a proposed phonetic symbol in the International Phonetic Association’s Exposé des principes.

A rotated capital G has sometimes been used as a substitute for the similar-looking eng . It is encoded in Unicode at U+2141.
It looks similar to the Pe.(פ) 
ᵷ was added to Unicode 4.1 in 2005, as U+1D77. Fonts that can display the character include Code2000, Doulos SIL and Charis SIL. Lowercase "B with hook," an IPA letter that resembles a turned one-story g, is more widely available as a substitute, at U+0253. However the vertical alignment does not match.

G